The Hyundai N 2025 Vision Gran Turismo is a concept car developed by Hyundai. The car was unveiled at the 2015 Frankfurt Motor Show. It was built under the Vision Gran Turismo project and to commemorate Hyundai's 50th anniversary in 2017. It also served as a launch platform for Hyundai's N performance division, as well as a glimpse into the future of fuel cell technology in motorsports.

Media 
The N 2025 Vision Gran Turismo is featured in the Polyphony Digital game Gran Turismo Sport as a Group X car (category made for Vision Gran Turismo cars and cars that do not fit into any other of the game's categories) and as a Group 1 car (category made for prototype race cars).

See also 
 Hyundai N
 Gran Turismo Sport
 Vision Gran Turismo

References

External links
 Gran Turismo website
 Hyundai N website

Gran Turismo (series)
N 2025 Vision Gran Turismo
Hydrogen cars